The 1986–87 UC Irvine Anteaters men's basketball team represented the University of California, Irvine during the 1986–87 NCAA Division I men's basketball season. The Anteaters were led by sixth year head coach Bill Mulligan. UCI played their first three home games at Crawford Hall until the new Bren Events Center was opened on January 8. They were members of the Pacific Coast Athletic Association. They finished the season 14–14 and 9–9 in PCAA play.

Previous season 
The 1985–86 Anteaters featured only one returning starter and the rest of the starting line-up was made up of transfers, including future NBA head coach Scott Brooks. Despite a slow start, the anteaters finished with an overall record of 16–11 which included an upset of #6 .

Roster

Schedule

|-
!colspan=9 style=|Non-Conference Season

|-
!colspan=9 style=|Conference Season

|-
!colspan=9 style=| PCAA tournament

Source

Awards and honors
Scott Brooks
AP Honorable Mention All-American
PCAA First Team All-Conference

Source:

References

UC Irvine Anteaters men's basketball seasons
UC Irvine
UC Irvine Anteaters
UC Irvine Anteaters